Jannik Christian Eckenrode (born December 13, 1993) is an American professional soccer player.

References

External links
 
 Jannik Eckenrode at George Mason Athletics
 

1993 births
Living people
American people of Swedish descent
American soccer players
Association football midfielders
D.C. United U-23 players
George Mason Patriots men's soccer players
People from Springfield, Virginia
Radford Highlanders men's soccer players
Richmond Kickers players
Soccer players from Virginia
Sportspeople from Fairfax County, Virginia
Tormenta FC players
Michigan Stars FC players
USL League One players
USL League Two players
National Independent Soccer Association players